Parliamentary elections were held in Vietnam on 25 April 1976, the first after the country was reunited following the North's military victory over the South the previous year. The Vietnamese Fatherland Front was the only party to contest the election, and won all 492 seats. Voter turnout was reported to be 98.8%.

Candidates
In what had been North Vietnam, the Workers' Party of Vietnam and other groups nominated 308 candidates for the 249 seats, while in the south, the Alliance of National, Democratic and Peaceful Forces and National Liberation Front nominated 297 candidates for the 243 seats. All were under the umbrella of the Vietnamese Fatherland Front.

Results

References

Vietnam
Elections in Vietnam
1976 in Vietnam
One-party elections